Seonkyoung Longest is a Korean-born celebrity chef. She won the competition for Robert Irvine's Restaurant Express. Unlike her other competitors (besides Jan Charles), she was a self-taught home cook.

Career

After moving to the US, food became an escape from day-to-day boredom. She began watching Food Network and creating meals with her own style.

As the result of her victory in a food competition show on Food Network in December 2013, she opened and became Executive Chef of Jayde Fuzion restaurant at the M Resort in Las Vegas, featuring a mixture of Japanese, Chinese and Korean small plates. She left the restaurant after four months as she realized that her true passion was with her own cooking show on Youtube "Asian at Home".

She stars in and produces Asian at Home, an Asian food show and website geared at teaching simple methods for mastering Asian Cuisine.

Early life

Seonkyoung was interested in illustration from a young age, and started her career while attending high school.  She trained as a cartoonist by working for a famous Korean cartoonist, Lee Hyun-se, helping in the production of his publications.

Her interests then moved to performance art and dance. She became a member of the Seoul Street Artist group and entered competitions as a professional belly dancer.

She met her husband Jacob in Seoul, Korea, and moved to the United States in 2009.

Personal life

Seonkyoung Longest was born and raised in South Korea, where she met her future husband Jacob Longest. They were married in Las Vegas in the presence of her mother and stepfather. She has been living in the U.S. since March 2009.

References

External links 

Living people
American YouTubers
Chefs of Korean cuisine
Food and cooking YouTubers
People from Seoul
South Korean chefs
South Korean emigrants to the United States
Year of birth missing (living people)